Ulm-Donautal station is a railway station in the south-western part of the town of Ulm, located in Baden-Württemberg, Germany.

References

Donautal